The Deputy Minister of Finance (Malay: Timbalan Menteri Kewangan; ; Tamil: நிதித்துறை துணை அமைச்சர் ) is a Malaysian cabinet position serving as deputy head of the Ministry of Finance.

List of Deputy Ministers of Finance
The following individuals have been appointed as Deputy Minister of Finance, or any of its precedent titles:

Colour key (for political coalition/parties):

See also 
 Minister of Finance (Malaysia)

References 

Ministry of Finance (Malaysia)